is a Japanese enka singer.

Ooe is represented with Kitajima Music Office.

Filmography

TV series

Advertisements

Discography

Singles

Albums

References

External links
  
  

Enka singers
1989 births
Living people
Musicians from Osaka Prefecture
21st-century Japanese singers
People from Kishiwada, Osaka
21st-century Japanese male singers